Meylan is a commune in the Isère department in southeastern France. It is part of the Grenoble urban unit (agglomeration).

Population

Misuse of public money 
In 2013, the newly reelected Mayor of Meylan Marie-Christine Tardy was brought to justice for unlawfully taking interest in an affair concerning her husband's remuneration.

In 2016, she received a suspended sentence of 18 months in jail and 5 years of ineligibility. Her husband also received a suspended sentence, of 12 months in jail. Both paid fines of over €20,000.

Education
There are five groups of preschools (écoles maternelles) and elementary schools: Béalières, Buclos/Grand Pré, Haut-Meylan, Maupertuis, and Mi-Plaine. There are two junior high schools, Collège des Buclos and Collège Lionel Terray, and a senior high school, Lycée du Grésivaudan.

The École Compleméntaire de Grenoble (グルノーブル補習授業校 Gurunōburu Hoshū Jugyō Kō), a part-time Japanese supplementary school, is held in the École Élémentaire Mi-Plaine.

Economy
Inovallée is a science park located at Meylan.

Twin towns
 Didcot, United Kingdom, since 1985
 Gonzales, USA, since 1985
 Planegg, Germany, since 1985

References

External links

 Home page 

Communes of Isère
Isère communes articles needing translation from French Wikipedia